Edward William Fitzalan-Howard, 18th Duke of Norfolk,  (born 2 December 1956), styled Earl of Arundel between 1975 and 2002, is a British peer who holds the hereditary office of Earl Marshal and, as Duke of Norfolk, is the most senior peer in the peerage of England. He is also titular head of the House of Howard.

Background and education
Norfolk is the son of Miles Francis Stapleton Fitzalan-Howard, 17th Duke of Norfolk, and his wife Anne Mary Teresa Constable-Maxwell. He was educated at Ampleforth College, a Roman Catholic independent school, before going up to Lincoln College, Oxford.

He has a brother, Lord Gerald Fitzalan-Howard, and three sisters, including the actress Marsha Fitzalan.

Career

Norfolk worked with various companies, and from 2000 to 2002 was Deputy Earl Marshal. Upon the death of his father in 2002, he inherited the late Duke of Norfolk's peerages and the position of Earl Marshal. He was a Cub Scout while at school at Ampleforth College and currently holds two appointments in the Scout Movement. He was until 2010 the President of 1st Arundel (Earl of Arundel's Own) Scout Group, and still serves as President of the Arundel & Littlehampton District Scouts. He is also Patron of West Sussex County Scouts. In June 2003 he was awarded the Medal of Merit for Services to the Scout Movement. He is an Honorary Fellow of St Edmund's College, Cambridge.

Norfolk was appointed Knight Grand Cross of the Royal Victorian Order (GCVO) in the 2022 Birthday Honours.

As hereditary Earl Marshal he had responsibility for arranging the 19 September 2022 state funeral of Queen Elizabeth II and the accession and coronation of King Charles III. He used that official role as the grounds for his successful application to have the public and the press excluded from some of the hearing before he was sentenced for a driving offence. He had driven through a red light, while using a mobile phone in his car. This led to a six months driving ban, and various fines and orders for costs.

Personal life
The Duke lives at Arundel Castle.
He was disqualified from driving for a period of six months in September 2022, as a result of a driving offence in April 2022. Added to previous motoring convictions, he incurred an excess of penalty points, resulting in the ban. His barrister argued in mitigation that he needed the ability to drive to organise the forthcoming coronation of King Charles III.

Family 

A Roman Catholic, the Duke of Norfolk is recognised by the Vatican as England's senior representative of the Faith. The Duke, then Earl of Arundel, married Georgina Susan Gore on 27 June 1987 at Arundel Cathedral. Together, they have three sons and two daughters:

 Henry Miles Fitzalan-Howard, Earl of Arundel (3 December 1987) who married Cecilia Mary Elizabeth dei Conti (of the Counts) Colacicchi, Nobile di Anagni on 16 July 2016. They have two daughters.
 Lady Rachel Fitzalan-Howard (10 June 1989)
 Lord Thomas Fitzalan-Howard (14 March 1992)
 Lady Isabel Fitzalan-Howard (7 February 1994)
 Lord Philip Fitzalan-Howard (14 July 1996)

The Duke and Duchess separated in 2011, but were reconciled by 2016, only to split up again; their divorce became final in 2022.

On 12 November 2022, the Duke married Francesca Herbert (née Bevan), former wife of The Hon. Henry Herbert, second son of the 7th Earl of Carnarvon.

Titles, styles, honours and arms

Titles and styles
In 2002, he inherited the Dukedom of Norfolk, as well as a number of earldoms, baronies, hereditary offices, and titles attached to the Dukedom, from his father. His office of Earl Marshal, one of the Great Officers of State, makes him responsible for State occasions, such as coronations and the State Opening of Parliament. He is also, by virtue of this office, one of the hereditary judges of the Court of Chivalry and head of the College of Arms, responsible for heraldry in England and Wales as well as other parts of the Commonwealth of Nations.

List of peerages
 18th Duke of Norfolk (Premier Duke of England)
 36th Earl of Arundel (Premier Earl of England)
 19th Earl of Surrey
 16th Earl of Norfolk
 13th Baron Beaumont
 26th Baron Maltravers
 16th Baron FitzAlan
 16th Baron Clun
 16th Baron Oswaldestre
 5th Baron Howard of Glossop

List of hereditary offices
 Earl Marshal
 Hereditary Marshal of England
 Chief Butler of England (One of three claimants to this office before the 1902 Court of Claims. The dispute was never resolved.)

Honours
  2 June 2022: Knight Grand Cross of the Royal Victorian Order

Arms

Ancestry

References

External links

Edward Fitzalan-Howard, 18th Duke of Norfolk

318
36
306
123
26
Barons Howard of Glossop
Barons Beaumont
Edward Fitzalan-Howard, 18th Duke of Norfolk
Fitzalan-Howard
Deputy Lieutenants of West Sussex
Earls Marshal
Crossbench hereditary peers
1956 births
Living people
People educated at Ampleforth College
English Roman Catholics
20th-century Roman Catholics
21st-century Roman Catholics
Earls of Norfolk (1644 creation)
Knights Grand Cross of the Royal Victorian Order